Nero is an unincorporated community in Johnson County, Kentucky, United States. It is located at an elevation of 628 feet (192 m). Nero is located in the ZIP Code Tabulation Area for ZIP code 41265.

References

Unincorporated communities in Johnson County, Kentucky
Unincorporated communities in Kentucky